David J. Julazadeh is a United States Air Force lieutenant general who serves as the deputy chief of staff for capability development of Allied Command Transformation, succeeding Thomas Sharpy. He most recently served as the chief of staff of the United States European Command. Previously, he was the director for plans, policy, strategy, and capabilities of the Pacific Air Forces.

Julazadeh is from East Peoria, Illinois and  graduated from Illinois Valley Central High School in 1984. He attended the University of Kansas, graduating in 1989 with a Bachelor of Science degree in civil engineering. Julazadeh later earned a Master of Aeronautical Science degree from Embry–Riddle Aeronautical University in 1994 and a Master of Military Operational Art and Science degree from the Air Command and Staff College in 2003.

References

1960s births
Living people
Place of birth missing (living people)
University of Kansas alumni
Embry–Riddle Aeronautical University alumni
Recipients of the Air Medal
Recipients of the Distinguished Flying Cross (United States)
Air Command and Staff College alumni
Recipients of the Meritorious Service Medal (United States)
Recipients of the Legion of Merit
United States Air Force generals
Recipients of the Defense Superior Service Medal